The difference between material culture and non-material culture is known as cultural lag. The term cultural lag refers to the notion that culture takes time to catch up with technological innovations, and the resulting social problems that are caused by this lag. In other words, cultural lag occurs whenever there is an unequal rate of change between different parts of culture causing a gap between material and non-material culture. Subsequently, cultural lag does not only apply to this idea only, but also relates to theory and explanation. It helps by identifying and explaining social problems to predict future problems in society. The term was first coined in William F. Ogburn's 1922 work 'culture do not synchronize exactly with the change in the material culture, this delay is the culture lag. If people fail to adjust to the rapid environmental and technological changes it will cause a lag or a gap between the cultures. This resonates with ideas of technological determinism, which means that technology determines the development of its cultural values and social structure. That is, it can presuppose that technology has independent effects on society at large. However it does not necessarily assign causality to technology. Rather cultural lag focuses examination on the period of adjustment to new technologies. According to sociologists William F. Ogburn, cultural lag is a common societal phenomenon due to the tendency of material culture to evolve and change rapidly and voluminously while non-material culture tends to resist change and remain fixed for a far longer period of time. This is due to the fact that ideals and values are much harder to change than physical things are. Due to the opposing nature of these two aspects of culture, adaptation of new technology becomes rather difficult. This can cause a disconnect between people and their society or culture. This distinction between material and non-material culture is also a contribution of Ogburn's 1922 work on social change. Ogburn's classic example of cultural lag was the period of adaptation when automobiles became faster and more efficient. It took some time for society to start building infrastructure that would tailor mainly to the new, more efficient, vehicles. This is because people are not comfortable with change and it takes them a little time to adapt. Hence, the term cultural lag.

Social Change With Respect to Nature and Original Change (1922) 
Social Change with Respect to Nature and Original Change is a 1922 work by Ogburn. This work was crucial in drawing attention to issues with social changes and responses. In this work he first coined the term 'cultural lag' to describe a lag between material and non-material cultures. Ogburn states that there is a gap between traditional cultural values and the technical realities in the world. This work was innovative at the time of its release and brought light to the issues of 'cultural lag' and the possible solutions that could fix these issues. This was not the first time these issues have been looked at, but this is the first time that real solutions were presented. Ogburn's theory was not widely accepted at first due to people having different interpretations of the work. In the book he also details the four factors of technical development, which are: invention, accumulation, diffusion, and adjustment. In the work he suggests that primary engine of change and progress is technology, but that it is tempered by social responses. The book had mixed a mixed response due to the fact that many interpreted his findings in many different ways.

Works on Cultural Lag

Social Change With Respect to Nature and Original Change (1922)

By: William F. Ogburn 
In Social Change with Respect to Nature and Original Change, renowned sociologist William F. Ogburn coins the term 'cultural lag'. Ogburn states his thesis of cultural lag in this work. He says that the source of most modern social change is material culture. His theory of cultural lag suggests that a period of maladjustment occurs when the non-material culture is struggling to adapt to new material conditions. The rapid changes material culture force other parts of culture to change, but the rate of change in these other parts of culture is much slower. He states that people live in a state of 'maladjustment' because of this. Ogburn makes claims that he played a considerable role in solving the issue of social evolution. He goes on to say that the fours solving factors of social evolution are: invention, exponential accumulation, diffusion, and adjustment. This work was unique and innovative at the time of its publication.

On Culture and Change (1964)

By: William F. Ogburn 
On Culture and Change is a work by William F. Ogburn which is a collection of 25 works from the years 1912–1961. It is an examination of social change and culture from the perspective of a sociologist. The 25 topics discussed in the work are separated into four topics: social evolution, social trends, short-run changes, and the subjective in the social sciences. This collection of works examines culture and social change in the world. The findings and information in On Culture and Change continues to be influential and useful to this day.

Future Shock (1970)

By: Alvin Toffler 
In Future Shock, Alvin Toffler outlines the shattering stress and disorientation that rapid change people feel when they are subjected to too much change in too short of a time. Toffler says that society is undergoing a transformation from an industrial society to a "super-industrial" society. He states that this accelerating rate of change is causing people to feel disconnected from the culture. Toffler argues that balance is needed between the accelerated rates of change in society and the limited pace of human response. Toffler says that it is not impossible to attempt to slow or even control the rapid change and that it is possible for the future to arrive before society is ready for it. Toffler says that the only way to keep equilibrium would be to create social and new personal regulators. Strategies need to be put in place so that rapid culture change can be shaped and controlled.

Cultural Lag: Conception & Theory (1997)

By: Richard L. Brinkman, June E. Brinkman 
In Cultural Lag: Conception & Theory, Richard & June Brinkman go into what the theory and concept of cultural lag actually is. They go into detail about the points supporting and the points disputing the concept of cultural lag. They evaluate Ogburn's claims about cultural lag and make them more understandable. The work evaluates the existence of cultural lag and its ability to possibly predict and describe cultural change in society. The work also goes into the relevance of the concept of cultural lag to socioeconomic policies in the world.

Material and non-material culture 
Material and non-material culture both are a big part of the theory of cultural lag. The theory states that material culture evolves and changes much quicker than non-material culture. Material culture being physical things, such as technology & infrastructure, and non-material culture being non-physical things, such as religion, ideals, and rules. Non-material culture lags behind material culture because the pace of human response is much slower than the pace of material change. New inventions and physical things that make people's lives easier are developed every single day, things such as religions and ideals are not. This is why there is cultural lag, if there is an invention created that goes against people's ideals it will take some time in order for them to accept the new invention and use it.

Material culture 
Material culture is a term used by sociologists that refers to all physical objects that humans create that give meaning or define a culture. These are physical things that can be touched, feel, taste, or observe with a sense. The term can include things like houses, churches, machines, furniture, or anything else that a person may have some sentimental for. The term can also include some things that cannot be seen but can be used. Things like the internet and television are also covered under the material culture definition. Material culture changes rapidly and changes depending where in the world somebody is. The environment may present different challenges in different parts of the world that is why material culture is so different everywhere. For example, houses in the heart of Tokyo are going to be smaller than the houses in Austin, Texas.

Non-material culture 
Non-material culture is a term used by sociologists that refers to non-physical things such as ideas, values, beliefs, and rules that shape a culture. There are different belief systems everywhere in the world, different religions, myths, and legends that people may believe in. These non-physical things can be information passed down from past generations or new ideas thought up by somebody in today's world. Non-Material culture tends to lag behind material culture due to the fact that it is easier to create a physical object that people will use than it is to create a system of beliefs or ideals that people will use and follow. Non-material culture tends to be very different wherever in the world someone is. This is because people from different backgrounds and areas in the world were raised on different ideals and beliefs that help shape society and culture.

Problems with cultural lag 
Cultural lag creates problems for a society in a multitude of ways. The issue of cultural lag tends to permeate any discussion in which the implementation of some new technology is a topic. For example, the advent of stem cell research has given rise to many new, potentially beneficial medical technologies; however these new technologies have also raised serious ethical questions about the use of stem cells in medicine. In this example, the cultural lag is the fear of people to use a new possibly beneficial medical practices because of ethical issues. This shows that there really is a disconnect between material culture (Stem cell research) and non-material culture (Issues with ethics). Cultural lag is seen as an issue because failure to develop broad social consensus on appropriate applications of modern technology may lead to breakdowns in social solidarity and the rise of social conflict.

Another issue that cultural lag causes is the rise of social conflict. Sometimes, people realize that they are disconnected with what is going on in society and they try to do everything they can to get back into the loop. This may result in a race to eliminate the cultural lag. For example, in the 1980s the arms race was in full effect. This is partly because one country discovered how to efficiently and safely use the widely thought unsafe nuclear power/energy. Once the United States was able to successfully harvest nuclear energy into a weapon many other countries realized that maybe nuclear energy isn't that bad and started to build weapons of mass destruction of their own.

Issues can also arise when an aspect of culture changes so rapidly that society is unable to prepare or adjust to it. This is seen in the example of cars overtaking other modes of transportation in the past. Since the production and ownership of cars increased so rapidly society was unable to keep up with it. Broader roads, traffic rules, and separate lanes for horses did not come until some time after automobiles became a part of the mainstream culture. This caused dangerous situations for pedestrians and the people driving these new automobiles. Sometimes society is not ready for the future and this could cause dangerous situations for certain people or groups of people.

References

Conclusion 
 Disruptive innovation
 Not invented here
 Progress trap
 Zeitgeist

Culture
Technology in society